"Heaven & Hell" is the solo debut single by Wu-Tang Clan rapper Raekwon from the soundtrack to the 1994 film Fresh and later featured on his 1995 solo debut album Only Built 4 Cuban Linx.... It features fellow Wu-Tang Clan member Ghostface Killah and backing vocals from Wu-Tang affiliate singer Blue Raspberry. Allmusic stated "everything culminates in "Heaven & Hell" and its longing for redemption"

As the rest of the album, the song was produced by the Wu-Tang Clan leader RZA and contains a sample from "Could I Be Falling in Love?" by Syl Johnson, reached #34 in the Hot Dance Music/Maxi-Singles Sales in 1994, and #21 in the Hot Rap Singles in 1995. In 2006, German singer Joy Denalane recorded a completely reworked version of the song, under the title "Heaven or Hell", featuring Raekwon, for her album Born & Raised. Cappadonna Also makes his first appearance in the music video.

Track listing
 "Heaven & Hell" (Radio Edit) - 3:14
 "Heaven & Hell" (Album Version) - 4:59
 "Heaven & Hell" (Instrumental) - 4:59

Charts

Weekly charts

References

1994 singles
Song recordings produced by RZA
1994 songs
Songs written by Raekwon
Songs written by Ghostface Killah
Loud Records singles
Raekwon songs
Ghostface Killah songs